The Antigua and Barbuda Football Association is the governing body of football in Antigua and Barbuda. They control the Antigua and Barbuda national football team.

Association staff

Competitions
The ABFA oversees the administration of Antigua and Barbuda's football leagues; the Premier Division, First Division, Second Division and the Female Division as well as the Antigua and Barbuda FA Cup.

National Stadium
The ABFA's official national stadium is the Antigua Recreation Ground which have recently been approved to host World Cup 2010 qualifying matches.  An attempt to have the Sir Vivian Richards Stadium approved for matches was rebuffed due to "ongoing works."

References

External links
 
 Antigua and Barbuda at the FIFA website.
 Antigua and Barbuda at CONCACAF site

CONCACAF member associations
Football in Antigua and Barbuda
Sports governing bodies in Antigua and Barbuda
Sports organizations established in 1928
1928 establishments in Antigua and Barbuda